Constitution of 1791 may refer to:

 Constitution of May 3, 1791, adopted by the Polish–Lithuanian Commonwealth
 French Constitution of 1791, adopted on 3 September 1791

See also
 Constitutional Act 1791, by the Parliament of Great Britain